Laiuse Romani was a Romani variety spoken in Estonia. It was a mixed language based on Romani and Estonian.

The Romani people first appeared in Estonia in the 17th century. According to rumors, they were first part of Swedish King Charles XII's Romani orchestra which he, after spending a winter in Laiuse, left behind. In 1841 all 44 Estonian Romani were collected and settled around Laiuse Parish. Their main stop was Raaduvere village, but they also lived in Rakvere, Jõgeva and its precincts. Before the Second World War there were 60 Romani in Laiuse. Laiuse Romani became extinct in the German occupation, when all its speakers were killed by the Nazis during the Porajmos.

Linguistic features
Laiuse Romani shares a number of linguistic features with Finnish Kalo, such as palatalization of velar consonants before front vowels and initial devoicing.

Notes

References

Romani in Estonia
Para-Romani
Languages of Estonia
Extinct languages of Europe
Mixed languages
Jõgeva Parish